Tractor Driver 2 is an absurd tragicomedy directed by Gleb and Igor Aleynikov, based on Renata Litvinova's script. The plot is loosely based on famous Soviet films in the manner of "Socialist realism": Tractor Drivers, Wedding in Malinovka (where one of the main characters, Nazar Duma, is namesake to a character from the previous film), and The Meeting Place Cannot Be Changed.

Plot 
Klim Yarko, a former tank driver, wants to find a peaceful job as a tractor driver. He falls in love with Maryana Bazhan and begins working in a successful collective farm, whose director is Maryana's father. However, he has a rival, Nazar Duma, a tractor driver in his 40s. On the other hand, the neighboring farm is getting bankrupt, and its youth creates a gang and terrorizes the farm where Klim works. The competition between two farms results in a bloody feud.

Cast 
 Yevgueni Kondratyev — Klim Yarko, tractor driver
 Larisa Borodina — Maryana Bazhan, master of speed plowing
 Aleksandr Belyavsky — Nazar Duma
 Anatoly Kuznetsov — Kirill Petrovich, director of the collective farm
 Boris Yukhananov — gang boss
 Yury Vnukov — hairstylist
 Irina Cherichenko  — Franya
 Larisa Luzhina — Markovna

External links 
 
 Tractor Drivers 2: a review of the film in English

1992 films
1990s avant-garde and experimental films
1992 comedy films
Russian comedy films
1990s Russian-language films
Russian avant-garde and experimental films